The Brunei Football Association was the governing body of football in Brunei until 2008.

History

Early days 
The Brunei State Amateur Football Association was formed in 1952 in Seria, Brunei. It was formally registered to the Registrar of Soceities in 1956, and afterwards joined FIFA in 1969 as the Brunei Amateur Football Association or simply BAFA, which it was still referred to as until its final days even after the dropping of 'Amateur' from its name in 1993. The association was responsible for Brunei's participation in the annual Borneo Cup, and from 1979 to 2005, the Brunei representative team in the Malaysian leagues.

A National Football Development Program named Projek Ikan Pusu (PIP) was established in 2001, jointly by BAFA and Jabatan Pendidikan Kokurikulum (JPKK).

2009 FIFA ban 
In September 2009 the association was banned globally by FIFA due to government interference in the association. On 30 May 2011 the ban by FIFA was lifted. The association was succeeded by the National Football Association of Brunei Darussalam.

Association members

See also
 Brunei (Liga Premier team)
 Football Federation of Brunei Darussalam, the association that governed Brunei football in 2009–2011

References

External links
 Brunei at AFC site
 FIFA website

Football in Brunei
Brunei Darussalam
Sports organizations disestablished in 2008
2008 disestablishments in Brunei